Hell Train may refer to:

Hell Train, by Christopher Fowler
Hell Train (film) 1985 French film
Hell Train (album) by Soltero
Helltrain, band

See also
Train to Hell, 1984 book by Alexei Sayle and David Stafford